Uroboros (stylized UROBOROS) is the seventh studio album by Japanese heavy metal band Dir En Grey. It was released on November 11, 2008, in the United States by The End Records and, due to the time difference, on November 12, 2008, in Japan through Firewall and European releases by Gan-Shin. A remastered and expanded edition was released in 2012, featuring new and reworked tracks. The album was remastered by Tue Madsen who also produced their following album Dum Spiro Spero.

The album is named after the Ouroboros symbol, which is a dragon or snake figure depicted in a full circle consuming itself. The symbol represents continuity and the cycle of power, emphasizing the theme of reincarnation, an idea propagated heavily by the band during promotion.

The album art, designed by the band's long-time artist Koji Yoda, was conceived with inspiration from King Crimson's 1970 album Lizard.

Background and production
Following the finale of their 2007 touring, much of the song writing was completed on an individual basis in January and February 2008, without the members meeting to collaborate. The original announcement of recording was slated for the beginning of 2008, while it was later announced that the album began pre-production in March 2008. The members regrouped after two months of solitary work and shared their independently developed tracks, with guitarist Kaoru saying the intent was to show "I'm making this song right now", with the intent of producing a larger variety of songs. Recording of the first tracks then began in the spring in the Sony Building in Tokyo. Dir En Grey later returned to the pre-production phase for the remaining tracks of the album.

The band recorded with many new instruments, including mandolin, congas, electric sitar, and biwa to create a unique sound, and vocalist Kyo sets emphasis on "non-screaming vocals," accentuating softer composition, while still blending in his unique screams, screeches, and polished death metal growls. For the album, Kaoru and Die utilized several guitar models and techniques; an unconventional method, some of the guitars were recorded directly from amps.

Music
Uroboros is "stuffed with themes of 'guilt and reincarnation' as well as 'the past, present and future of Dir En Grey, as guitarist Kaoru stated in a press release. This was later echoed in CDJapan's album overview, calling the album "a sort of return for the band, revisiting the pre-Withering to Death. era." Kaoru also included that the album would again be a progression into "heavier and darker" sounds than prior albums, as well as an "oriental and religious mood".

In an interview in the band's regular fan-club magazine, Haiiro no Ginka, interviewer You Masuda described the style in comparison with the band's preceding album, The Marrow of a Bone:

With the announcement of an American release date, guitarist Kaoru expressed further opinion on the album's style, saying the album would experiment with oriental sounds, and the "hard and heavy" atmosphere found on The Marrow of a Bone would be absent, instead favoring more elegant instrumentation and "something that lets you visualize several scenes".

Together with the band's label, a California-based radio station, Indie 103.1, premiered music from Uroboros on October 19, 26 and November 2. The tracks "Red Soil" and "Dozing Green" were played on the first night, with "Glass Skin" chosen on the second, available both as a radio broadcast and internet radio show. On the 2 November broadcast, the band debuted "Gaika, Chinmoku ga Nemuru Koro".

During promotion, the track "Stuck Man" was referred to as "Third Time Does the Trick", however the title was changed before the final track listing was revealed.

In harmony with the Asian themes in the album, the first two tracks titles, "Sa Bir" and "Vinushka" are derived from the Tibetan language and Russian language respectively. The former referring to the movement of the Earth, while the latter is a "word from Russian origin" used "to talk about elements that are linked to sins," according to VerdamMnis Magazine's interview Kaoru did with French journalist Mandah Frénot. "Vinushka", which is a form of the word "vina", can be translated as "guilt".

Release
A first time for the band, the album debuted in the United States, being released in four editions. The album is available via digital download, a standard CD, a deluxe limited edition release packaged in a cardboard sleeve and slipcase with both a CD and DVD, and finally in a twelve-inch LP with a card to download the digital release. The CD and DVD edition come with a series of live videos on the DVD, rather than making-of footage from the Japanese release. The live footage includes "Repetition of Hatred", "Agitated Screams of Maggots", and "Hydra -666-" from the band's Zepp Tokyo concert from 22 December 2007, "Dead Tree" from Wacken Open Air 2007, and "Dozing Green" from a show on Tour 07 The Marrow of a Bone; tracks one through four were all previously included on In Weal or Woe.

The album was released in three editions in Japan; a standard edition, a limited edition and a deluxe edition. The standard edition includes only the main album, while the limited edition includes a bonus disc with unplugged tracks and internationally exclusive tracks. The deluxe edition contains both discs packaged with the limited edition, as well as a bonus DVD containing a documentary of the album's conception, and two LPs.

The original intent of the band's record label was to press an approximate amount of deluxe editions, however, due to extremely rapid sales and high demand, the edition was opened to a pre-order limit of August 16, after which no more copies were pressed and only leftover pressings were commercially available.

The European release, handled by Gan-Shin, began in France on November 12, simultaneously with the Japanese release. The album is available throughout Europe in two editions; the regular that includes only the album's feature tracks, while the limited edition includes three bonus tracks.

A remastered and expanded edition was released in 2012, featuring new and reworked tracks. The album was remastered by Tue Madsen who also produced their following album Dum Spiro Spero. This featured an extended version of "Sa Bir", a special version of "Bugaboo" that was previously releases only on the vinyl version that came with the [2CD + 1DVD + 2LP] limited edition of Uroboros, and Japanese versions of "Dozing Green" and "Glass Skin". In addition, "Hydra -666-" is also included, previously only available as a B-side to the "Dozing Green" single.

Reception

Uroboros quickly received positive reviews, being acknowledged as an experimental album for the band, and a defined shift back to the band's roots, while retaining the metal elements of the recent works. Allmusic chose Uroboros as an "AMG Album Pick", praising the release for its variety and willingness to escape the band's stereotypes; Another oft-mentioned aspect is the continued use of Japanese lyrics by Kyo; however, the album was also advertised with specific attention to the English revisions of "Dozing Green" and "Glass Skin", while other tracks also had heavy use of English. Several professional reviews have said the use of Japanese is something that could preclude the band having mainstream popularity, but some approve of the band's consistency with their native language. A negative that some reviewers identified is repetitiveness in the album's style, though this was interpreted as a strong point by JD Considine of Revolver.

In its debut release week, the album sold 6,054 copies and reached number 114 on the Billboard 200 albums chart. This marked Dir En Grey's first time ranking on the United States' central music chart. In the band's native country, the album was met with high sales, exceeding thirty-seven thousand, which brought the album to a number four spot on the Oricon chart. This was Dir En Grey's best performance since Kisou (2002).

Track listing

Bonus tracks

Bonus Discs

Remastered & Expanded

Personnel

 Dir En Grey – producer, composer
 Kyo – vocals, lyricist
 Kaoru – electric guitar, acoustic guitar, electric sitar, backing vocals
 Die – electric guitar, acoustic guitar, mandolin, backing vocals
 Toshiya – bass guitar, biwa, backing vocals
 Shinya – drums, congas, percussion
 Jun Fukamachi – piano, pipe organ (unplugged 1 & 2)
 Tadasuke – piano (unplugged 3)
 Yoshinori Abe – programming
 Toshiaki Ishii – programming
 Hiroshi "Dynamite Tommy" Tomioka – executive producer
 Yasushi "Koni-Young" Konishi – recording, mixing (feature disc)
 Akinori Kaizaki – mixing (unplugged disc)

 Ted Jensen – mastering (feature disc)
 Kazushige Yamazaki – mastering (unplugged 1, 2 & 3, "Dozing Green (Before Construction Ver.)")
 Hiroyuki Kondo – director, filming
 Mitsuhiko Koechi – video lighting
 Koji Yoda – art direction, art design
 Toshio Sakurai – art design
 Satoshi Mizuno – art design
 Genta Kosumi – illustration
 Takato Yamamoto – illustration
 Shigeo Kikuchi – photography
 Jewels – translation
 Yuichi "You" Masuda – interviewer (deluxe DVD)

Release history

Charting

References

External links
 Uroboros announcement page

2008 albums
Dir En Grey albums
The End Records albums